Ingrid Stölzel (born 14 January 1971) is a German composer of contemporary classical music who has lived and worked in the United States since 1991.

Biography

Ingrid Stölzel was born in Karlsruhe, Germany in 1971.  She holds degrees in music from the University of Missouri, Kansas City, Conservatory of Music and Dance (Doctorate of Musical Arts in Composition; Bachelor of Music) and the University of Hartford - Hartt School of Music (Master of Music in Composition). Her principal composition teachers include Robert Carl, James Mobberley, James Sellars, Chen Yi and Zhou Long.  Stölzel currently teaches composition at University of Kansas School of Music in Lawrence, Kansas.

Music 
Composer Ingrid Stölzel has been described as having “a gift for melody”(San Francisco Classical Voice) and “evoking a sense of longing” that creates “a reflective and serene soundscape that makes you want to curl up on your windowsill to re-listen on a rainy day.”  Her music has been described as “tender and beautiful” (American Record Guide) and as creating a “haunting feeling of lyrical reflection and suspension in time and memory” (Classical-Modern Review). At the heart of her compositions is a belief that music can create profound emotional connections with the listener.

Awards include the Suzanne and Lee Ettelson Composer's Award,  the RED NOTE Composition Competition, Robert Avalon International Competition for Composers, Kaleidoscope Chamber Orchestra Competition,  Ortus International New Music Competition, Cayuga Chamber Orchestra Composers Competition, Arizona Pro Arte Competition and NewMusic@ECU Composition Competition, among others.

References

1971 births
Living people
German women composers
21st-century women composers
21st-century German composers
University of Missouri–Kansas City alumni
University of Hartford Hartt School alumni
University of Kansas faculty
Musicians from Karlsruhe
German expatriates in the United States
20th-century German composers
20th-century women composers
20th-century German women musicians
21st-century German women musicians